Montesquiu is a municipality in the comarca (county) of Osona in Catalonia, Spain. It is situated on the banks of the Ter river in the north of the comarca. It is on the main communication route between Barcelona and Puigcerdà, served by the N-152 road and a station on the RENFE railway line. The thirteenth-century castle is used for cultural events during the summer. Montesquiu became part of Osona in the comarcal revision of 1990. Previously, it formed part of Ripollès.

Demography

References

 Panareda Clopés, Josep Maria; Rios Calvet, Jaume; Rabella Vives, Josep Maria (1989). Guia de Catalunya, Barcelona:Caixa de Catalunya.  (Spanish).  (Catalan).

External links
Official website 
 Government data pages 

Municipalities in Osona